UFH can refer to:

 Under floor heating
 Unfractionated heparin, an anticoagulant used in medicine
 University of Fort Hare
 Ungdomsklubben UFH